Jérémy Pancras (born 26 December 1991) is a French freestyle skier. He was born in Annecy. 
He competed at the 2014 Winter Olympics in Sochi, in slopestyle.

References

External links 
 

1991 births
Living people
Sportspeople from Annecy
Freestyle skiers at the 2014 Winter Olympics
French male freestyle skiers
Olympic freestyle skiers of France